Clarence Ranjith Jeyaretnam, better known as Clarence Jey, is an American record producer, multi-instrumentalist, composer and songwriter of Sri Lankan Tamil heritage who has had music chart on the US Billboard Hot 100, co-wrote the song "Friday" and worked on various award-winning US television shows including an Emmy-nominated show.

Life and career
Jey spent some of his childhood in Australia, performing with local bands and composing and producing music at his studio in Melbourne where he wrote and produced the theme song and additional music for the 2007 US Emmy-nominated Discovery Kids animation television show, Growing Up Creepie. This led to his relocation to Los Angeles, California. Upon his relocation, he produced music for guitarist and former member of American bands Poison and The Winery Dogs, Richie Kotzen. He has since composed music and written songs for television shows including Lego City Adventures, Common Law, America's Got Talent, Randy Jackson Presents America's Best Dance Crew and The Newsroom. Jey's songs and music have been used on commercials including the US retailer Kohls and in Vodafone ads.

Jey has also worked in film. In 2014, he produced and composed songs, and was music supervisor for the film Full Love, directed by Jean-Claude Van Damme, which premiered at the Shanghai International Film Festival. Jey worked with the US reality show, Famous in 12, on The CW network, where he was invited to assist the up-and-coming artist to find her dream.

In 2015, Clarence Jey produced music for Grammy winning R&B group, All-4-One's record, "Twenty+", which was released in July, 2015. In 2016, Jey composed music and wrote lyrics for the musical theater show "Jambalaya The Musical", along with his production partner, American songwriter Jeff Barry. Clarence Jey was involved in part of the music in the Hallmark Channel movie titled My Christmas Love, as well as Australian TV comedy series Please Like Me.

In 2018, Jey produced a song titled "Wasted" on New Zealand roots reggae band Katchafire's album Legacy, which debuted at number 3 on US Billboard Reggae Album Chart.

2019 saw Jey and his writing partner Jeff Barry composed and wrote a song for Lego City Adventures, a computer-animated television series, produced by The Lego Group, for Nickelodeon television.

"Friday"
In 2011, Jey was part of ARK Music Factory and was involved in the creation of the song  "Friday", by Rebecca Black, which had over 200 million YouTube views and, on March 29, 2011, surpassed Justin Bieber's "Baby" as the most disliked YouTube video, with 1.17 million dislikes. Jey co-wrote and produced the controversial song, which reached the Billboard Hot 100 and iTunes Top 20 in March 2011.

The song has received almost universally negative reviews from music critics, for its songwriting, instrumentation, Black's vocals, and the video choreography, while being referred to as 'genius' by media executive, Simon Cowell. "Friday" was covered by the cast of Fox network's show Glee, as well as by comedians Jimmy Fallon and Stephen Colbert on Fallon's album Blow Your Pants Off.

Other ventures

Pop-U-Lar 

In 2011, he established Pop-U-Lar. On September 16, 2011, they released Kenny James' "Party Like the Rich Kids", even though Jey had left Ark the trailer for the song was still uploaded to Ark's YouTube channel. Pop-U-Lar's YouTube channel "PopUraZZi" only had videos of former artist Kenny James who is most likely their first artist. Pop-U-Lar was still used as a label by Jey until 2014. For a small period in 2014 Pop-U-Lar and Music Intersection co-existed, for example the copyright of Jey's song "Way Up" is owned by Music Intersection but says to visit Pop-U-Lar's website for more information and for "a chance to be the next Pop-U-Lar artist!". Pop-U-Lar's legal company CT Enterprises International, LLC shut down in November 2012 even though Music Intersection's legal company Music Intersection, Inc. wasn't started until March 2014. Their artist Kenny James seems to be a former Ark artist as he is seen in their "Welcome to Ark" video as he is seen 1 minute and 44 seconds into the video, which may be why his video trailer is on Ark's channel, James never released any music with Ark. Pop-U-Lar's first artist was much different than Ark's music, it contained profanity, alcoholism and cheating on his significant other. As seen on Pop-U-Lar's Twitter they had signed rock band Breaking Arrows. Kenny James was with Pop-U-Lar until it shutdown as seen on their Twitter where they were tweeting about him until July 2014. Pop-U-Lar's website shutdown in early 2014 which is when it was assumed to be shutdown and replaced with Music Intersection.

Music Intersection 

Music Intersection, Inc. is an American record label founded on March 17, 2014 by Clarence Jey. It is distributed by CD Baby. Music Intersection's longest artist is Josef Gordod, his first release with them "Put It On" was featured in a Jeep commercial in 2014. The "featured video" of the now inactive MusicIntersection.com is Kenny James' "Party Like the Rich Kids" even though it was released via Jey's first attempt at a label "Pop-U-Lar". Music Intersection also has a in-house songwriter Jeff Barry, who was featured along side Jey in Josef Gordon's "What a Christmas this Is".

Awards 
2017 saw Clarence Jey being awarded "Tamil American Pioneer", an award which recognizes North American Tamil Pioneers in certain fields by the Federation of Tamil Sangams of North America, an organization of the North American Tamil community.

References

External links
Official website

American record producers
American people of Sri Lankan Tamil descent
Tamil musicians
Australian record producers
Australian male composers
Australian composers
Australian people of Sri Lankan Tamil descent
Living people
Year of birth missing (living people)
Sri Lankan Tamil musicians